Sport Vereniging Deportivo Nacional (English:Sports Club), known as Deportivo Nacional or simply Nacional is an Aruban football club based in Palm Beach, Noord, which currently play in Aruba's first division.
The hardcore supporters group call themselves "Bad Boys" or “Bechi Boys”. They are not to be considered hardcore hooligans such as in Europe. But they are faithful followers cheering Dep. Nacional's games.
Fanbase for Dep. Nacional is spread over the whole Noord neighborhood. These include "barionan" such as Palm Beach, Alto Vista, Boegoeroei, Montserrat, Camay, Westpunt, Kudawecha & Turibana.

Achievements

Aruban Division di Honor: 6
 2000, 2001, 2003, 2007, 2017, 2021

Copa Betico Croes: 0
 Finalist: 3
 2006, 2008, 2023

Copa ABC: 1
 2019

Participation in CONCACAF competitions
CFU Club Championship: 1 appearance
2007 – First Round (2nd in Group A – 1 pt), (stage 1 of 4)

Caribbean Club Shield: 2 appearance
 2018 - Fourth place
 2022 - First round

Current squad
As of 10 September 2022

Current technical staff

External links
Official site
Facebook page

References

Deportivo Nacional